Brian Boucher (born January 2, 1977) is an American former professional ice hockey goaltender who is a game and studio analyst on national ESPN and ABC games and also Philadelphia Flyers games on NBC Sports Philadelphia. He played 13 seasons in the National Hockey League (NHL) for the Philadelphia Flyers, Phoenix Coyotes, Calgary Flames, Chicago Blackhawks, Columbus Blue Jackets, San Jose Sharks, and Carolina Hurricanes.

He led the league in goals against average for the 1999–2000 NHL season. He currently holds the NHL's modern record for the longest shutout streak at 332:01, set while he was a member of the Phoenix Coyotes during the 2003–04 NHL season.

Playing career

Early Philadelphia years
Boucher was drafted by the Philadelphia Flyers in the first round of the 1995 NHL Entry Draft, 22nd overall. He began play with the Flyers during the 1999–2000 season, taking the starting position from veteran John Vanbiesbrouck and helping the team secure the Eastern Conference and Atlantic Division regular season titles while leading the NHL in goals against average (GAA) at 1.91. In the 2000 Stanley Cup playoffs, he backstopped his team to the Eastern Conference Finals. En route, he recorded several memorable moments, including a five-overtime victory against the Pittsburgh Penguins and a sprawling save against Patrik Eliáš of the New Jersey Devils, which thereafter became known as a "Boosh" among goaltenders. Although the Flyers were ahead three games to one in the Eastern Conference Finals against the Devils, and despite the return of the injured Eric Lindros, Boucher and the Flyers lost in seven games to the eventual Stanley Cup champion Devils. In the 2000–01 season, a weak start to the season saw him lose his starting position to Roman Čechmánek.

Phoenix/Shutout streak

On June 12, 2002, Boucher was traded (along with multiple draft picks) to the Phoenix Coyotes in exchange for Michal Handzuš and Robert Esche. In the 2003–04 season, Boucher broke the modern-day NHL record for the longest shutout streak by a goaltender, going unscored upon for 332 minutes, or five-and-a-half games. On February 1, 2006, he was traded to the Calgary Flames (along with Mike Leclerc) in exchange for Steven Reinprecht and Philippe Sauvé.

Chicago/Columbus
Boucher began the 2006–07 season with the Chicago Blackhawks. On February 27, 2007, he was acquired on waivers by the Columbus Blue Jackets. Boucher arrived hours prior to the Blue Jackets-Colorado Avalanche game that evening.  During the game, he wore Ty Conklin's number 35 sweater. On March 3, 2007, Boucher made his Blue Jackets debut against his former team, Phoenix. His first game was a 4–3 win.

San Jose Sharks
On July 23, 2007, Boucher signed an American Hockey League (AHL) contract with the Philadelphia Phantoms, the Philadelphia Flyers' AHL affiliate. He played with the Phantoms until he signed a one-year contract with the San Jose Sharks on February 26, 2008.

On June 25, 2008, stating how much he liked the San Jose atmosphere, he signed another one-year contract with the Sharks, worth US$650,000. He recorded consecutive shutouts in each of his first two games of the 2008–09 season for the Sharks before allowing a goal in his third game.

Return to Philadelphia
On July 1, 2009, Boucher agreed to a two-year contract with the Philadelphia Flyers to be the steady, veteran backup to the starting goaltender Ray Emery. However, when Emery incurred an injury midway through the season, Boucher was thrust into the spotlight with mediocre results. A hand injury soon pushed Boucher to the sideline, and he was replaced by third-string goaltender Michael Leighton. Leighton excelled in Boucher's absence, and once healthy, Boucher found himself backing-up Leighton. Upon the return of Emery, Boucher was further demoted to the press box, with Leighton now the backup. Emery soon re-injured himself, giving Boucher a chance to back-up Leighton, who once again was playing well. Near the end of the season, with only 13 games left, Leighton went down with a high-ankle sprain, and Boucher was back into the spotlight for the Flyers once again. After a 2–1 shootout victory in the final game of the season against the New York Rangers, Boucher and the Flyers advanced to the playoffs.

In the 2010 playoffs, Boucher defeated Martin Brodeur and the New Jersey Devils in the first round four games to one. The national media remarked he was the surprise of the playoffs after the first round with his outstanding play in net. The Flyers defeated the Boston Bruins in the second round by overcoming a three-game deficit, but Boucher was injured in Game 5 of that series with knee injuries. Boucher returned from his injuries to serve as a backup to Leighton in Game 1 of the Stanley Cup Finals against the Chicago Blackhawks. He saw game action in Game 1 and Game 5 in relief of Leighton, but the Flyers lost in six games to the Blackhawks.

In the 2010–11 season, Boucher split time in goal with standout rookie Sergei Bobrovsky after Leighton was demoted to the AHL, in part for hiding an injury. Bobrovsky started most of the games, and was named the Flyers playoff starter. After Game 2 of the conference quarter-finals against the Buffalo Sabres, in which Boucher relieved Bobrovsky and earned the win, Boucher started the next three games. However, he was pulled in Game 5 in favour of Leighton, who was called up as a third goaltender. Leighton played well but lost Game 5 in overtime, nonetheless earning the start for Game 6. However, in Game 6, Leighton allowed three goals in the opening period, and once again Boucher was able to earn the win in relief, making Boucher the only goaltender in NHL history to record two wins in a playoff series when coming in relief. Boucher went on to start Game 7 as the Flyers defeated Buffalo. Boucher started the first three games in the next round against Boston, but played poorly, allowing for deposed starter Bobrovsky to return in Game 4 as the Flyers were ultimately swept.

Carolina Hurricanes and third stint with Flyers
After the Flyers acquired goaltender Ilya Bryzgalov and decided to keep Bobrovsky as backup, Boucher was the odd man out. On July 1, 2011, Boucher was signed by the Carolina Hurricanes to a two-year contract worth $950,000 per season. He played sparingly as the backup to Cam Ward, and his season ended early due to injury.

On January 13, 2013, after the end of the 2012–13 NHL lockout, Boucher began his third stint with the Flyers, and fourth overall with the organization, when he and defenseman Mark Alt were traded to Philadelphia in exchange for Luke Pither. Three days later, Boucher was waived and sent down to Adirondack, the new home of the AHL Phantoms. Boucher was named the team's starting goaltender, relegating previous starter Scott Munroe to backup duty and sending Phantoms backup Cal Heeter to the Trenton Titans, the Flyers' ECHL affiliate. On February 10, Boucher was recalled by the Flyers after Michael Leighton suffered a lower body injury. He saw action in four games before being sent back down to Adirondack on March 9 after Leighton returned to health.

Broadcasting career
After he retired from hockey in 2013, Boucher served as color commentator and studio analyst for the Philadelphia Flyers' regional telecasts on NBC Sports Philadelphia with host Al Morganti. He also worked on some of the team's regional television broadcasts on NBC Sports Philadelphia when neither primary color commentator Keith Jones and back-up color commentator Bill Clement and later Scott Hartnell are unavailable.

At the start of the 2015–16 NHL season, Boucher joined NBC Sports as an "Inside the Glass" reporter and studio analyst. From 2018 to 2021, Boucher worked as the "Inside the Glass" reporter with the lead broadcast team of Mike Emrick and Eddie Olczyk, a role he shares with Pierre McGuire.

In addition to NBCSN, Boucher was also a studio analyst for NHL Network.

After the conclusion of NBC’s last Stanley Cup Finals, Boucher joined ESPN/ABC for its NHL coverage, starting with the 2021–22 season, ESPN/ABC’s first season under a 7-year reunion deal, which brought both networks its first set of NHL games since 2004, as their #2 color commentator, behind Ray Ferraro.

Personal life
Boucher has a wife, Melissa, and a son and daughter.  His son Tyler is a left winger for the Ottawa 67's and was a first round draft choice of the Ottawa Senators in 2021.  Boucher attended Mount St. Charles Academy in Woonsocket, Rhode Island,  and played major junior hockey for the Tri-City Americans.

Records
 Modern day NHL record with five consecutive shutouts in 2003–04.

Career statistics

Regular season and playoffs

International

Awards and achievements

WHL
 1995–96 – (West) second All-Star team
 1996–97 – (West) first All-Star team
 1996–97 – Del Wilson Trophy (WHL Goaltender of the Year)

International
 1997 – All-Star Selection, IIHF World Junior Hockey Championships

AHL
 1998 – Calder Cup champion with Philadelphia Phantoms

NHL
 1999–2000 – NHL All-Rookie team
 1999–2000 – GAA leader (1.91)
 Player of the Week (October 29, 2001 – November 4, 2001)

References

External links

 
 Brian Boucher's profile at Hockey Goalies

1977 births
Living people
Adirondack Phantoms players
American men's ice hockey goaltenders
Calgary Flames players
Carolina Hurricanes players
Chicago Blackhawks players
Columbus Blue Jackets players
EV Zug players
HV71 players
Ice hockey players from Rhode Island
Mount Saint Charles Academy alumni
National Hockey League broadcasters
National Hockey League first-round draft picks
People from Woonsocket, Rhode Island
Philadelphia Flyers draft picks
Philadelphia Flyers players
Philadelphia Phantoms players
Phoenix Coyotes players
San Antonio Rampage players
San Jose Sharks players
Tri-City Americans players
American expatriate ice hockey players in Sweden
American expatriate ice hockey players in Switzerland
American expatriate ice hockey players in Canada